The Pleasant Street Historic District is a historic district along Pleasant Street (Massachusetts Route 60) in Belmont, Massachusetts.  The district extends along Pleasant Street, from Winn Street to just south of Concord Avenue in the south, and also includes properties on adjacent streets northwest of Pleasant Street.  The area is characterized mid- to late-19th century single family homes, generally on large lots, as well as Belmont's principal municipal buildings: its town hall and library.

The district was listed on the National Register of Historic Places in 1979.

See also
National Register of Historic Places listings in Middlesex County, Massachusetts

References

External links
Historic District info

Belmont, Massachusetts
Historic districts in Middlesex County, Massachusetts
National Register of Historic Places in Middlesex County, Massachusetts
Historic districts on the National Register of Historic Places in Massachusetts